

Airports

Business
 Sanlam Centre, Windhoek

Dams
 Avis Dam near Windhoek
 Bondels Dam near Karas
 Friedenau Dam near Windhoek
 Goreangab Dam near Windhoek
 Hardap Dam near Mariental
 Nauaspoort Dam near Groot Aub
 Naute Dam near Keetmanshoop
 Oanob Dam near Rehoboth
 Olushandja Dam near Oshakati
 Omatako Dam near Windhoek
 Omatjenne Dam near Otjiwarongo
 Sartorius von Bach Dam near Okahandja
 Swakoppoort Dam near Okahandja
 Tilda Viljoen Dam near Gobabis

Government
 State House of Namibia
 Tintenpalast

Hospitals
There are 369 medical facilities in Namibia, including 36 hospitals.  Other medical facilities are clinics and health centers.  The following are some of the more notable hospitals and clinics:
 Cottage Medi-Clinic
 Gobabis State Hospital
 Katutura State Hospital
 Onandjokwe Lutheran Hospital
 Roman Catholic Hospital
 Rundu State Hospital
 Windhoek Central Hospital
 Keetmanshoop State Hospital
 Lady Pohamba Private Hospital

Malls
 Maerua Mall
 Wernhil Park Mall
 The Grove Mall of Namibia

Museums, parks and monuments
 Alte Feste
 Parliament Gardens
 Zoo Park

Railway stations

Sports venues
 Kuisebmund Stadium in Walvis Bay
 Rossmund Desert Golf Course in Swakopmund
 Hage Geingob Rugby Stadium in Windhoek
 Independence Stadium in Windhoek
 Khomasdal Stadium in Katutura
 Ramblers Stadium in Windhoek
 Sam Nujoma Stadium in Katutura
 Windhoek Country Club Resort outside of Windhoek
 Mokati Stadium in Otjiwarongo
 Oscar Norich Stadium in Tsumeb
 Oshakati Independence Stadium in Oshakati

Schools

References